Cossura consimilis is a polychaetid worm that was distributed throughout New Zealand. Cossura consimilis is a slender thread-like worm with a blunt head, growing up to 20mm in length. Cossura consimilis live in muddy sand in shallow intertidal harbours and estuaries, to the inner continental shelf and out to the continental slope. Cossura consimilis tolerates a sediment mud content of 5 to 65%, with an optimum range of 20-25%.

References 

Annelids